Female Fugitive is a 1938 American drama film, directed by William Nigh. The film stars Evelyn Venable, Craig Reynolds, and Reed Hadley. It was released on April 15, 1938.

Cast
 Evelyn Venable as Peggy Mallory
 Craig Reynolds as Jim Mallory
 Reed Hadley as Bruce Dunning
 John Kelly as Red
 Charlotte Treadway as Mrs. Bannister
 John Merton as Mort
 Ray Bennett as Burke
 Reginald Sheffield as Doctor
 Emmett Vogan as Leonard
 Martha Tibbetts as Claire Bannister
 Lee Phelps as Roberts

References

External links
 
 

American black-and-white films
American drama films
1938 drama films
1938 films
Monogram Pictures films
Films directed by William Nigh
1930s English-language films
1930s American films
English-language drama films